Jhutaki  is a village development committee in Saptari District in the Sagarmatha Zone of south-eastern Nepal. At the time of the 1991 Nepal census it had a population of 8,000 people living in 800 individual households. Different caste people like  Yadav, mandal, sha, ram, mallah, sharma, dom, shada etc., used to live in village. It consists of four subvillages (Puwaritol, Pachhwaritol, jhutaki,  and  kajaratole). It has three small bazaars but it does not have good road facility.[1] Most of the people are farmers and they grow paddy, wheat, pulses, vegetables, etc. Some of the people used to depend on animal husbandry and fishery to survive.            
Economy 
Most of the people  involved  in farming, animal husbandry and fishing.

References

Populated places in Saptari District
VDCs in Saptari District